Leppa may refer to:

 Leppä River, a river of Sweden
 Perttu Leppä (born 1964), Finnish film director and writer
 Justin Leppitsch (born 1975), an Australian rules footballer
 A Sardinian knife; see Resolza